Daniel Ljunggren (born February 26, 1994) is a Swedish professional ice hockey player. He is currently under contract to Mora IK of the HockeyAllsvenskan (Allsv).

He made his Elitserien debut playing with Brynäs IF during the 2012–13 Elitserien season.

References

External links

1994 births
Living people
Almtuna IS players
Brynäs IF players
Leksands IF players
Mora IK players
Swedish ice hockey forwards
Tingsryds AIF players